Bryotropha is a genus of the twirler moth family (Gelechiidae). Among these, it is placed in the tribe Anomologini of subfamily Gelechiinae; the tribe was formerly considered a distinct subfamily Anomologinae.

Species
Species of Bryotropha are: 
horribilis-group
 Bryotropha horribilis Rutten & Karsholt, 2005
 Bryotropha sabulosella (Rebel, 1905)
domestica-group
 Bryotropha domestica (Haworth, 1828)
 Bryotropha vondermuhlli Nel & Brusseaux, 2003
terrella-group
 Bryotropha rossica Anikin & Piskunov, 1996
 Bryotropha azovica Bidzilia, 1997
 Bryotropha arabica Amsel, 1952
 Bryotropha brevivalvata Li & Zheng, 1997
 Bryotropha patockai Elsner & Karsholt, 2003
 Bryotropha purpurella (Zetterstedt, 1839)
 Bryotropha parapurpurella Bidzilya, 1998
 Bryotropha elegantula Li & Zheng, 1997
 Bryotropha tachyptilella (Rebel, 1916)
 Bryotropha italica Karsholt & Rutten, 2005
 Bryotropha politella (Stainton, 1851)
 Bryotropha aliterrella (Rebel, 1935)
 Bryotropha nupponeni Karsholt & Rutten, 2005
 Bryotropha terrella
 Bryotropha sattleri Nel, 2003
 Bryotropha desertella (Douglas, 1850)
 Bryotropha palliptera Li & Wang, 2000
 Bryotropha wolschrijni Karsholt & Rutten, 2005
 Bryotropha heckfordi Karsholt & Rutten, 2005
similis-group
 Bryotropha figulella (Staudinger, 1859)
 Bryotropha plantariella (Tengström, 1848)
 Bryotropha galbanella (Zeller, 1839)
 Bryotropha gemella Rutten & Karsholt, 2004
 Bryotropha boreella (Douglas, 1851)
 Bryotropha phycitiniphila Karsholt & Rutten, 2005
 Bryotropha sutteri Karsholt & Rutten, 2005
 Bryotropha gallurella Amsel, 1952
 Bryotropha hendrikseni Karsholt & Rutten, 2005
 Bryotropha pallorella Amsel, 1952 (= B. mulinoides)
 Bryotropha hulli Karsholt & Rutten, 2005
 Bryotropha plebejella (Zeller, 1847)
 Bryotropha dryadella (Zeller, 1850) (= B. saralella)
 Bryotropha basaltinella (Zeller, 1839)
 Bryotropha affinis (Haworth, 1828)
 Bryotropha umbrosella (Zeller, 1839) (= B. mundella)
 Bryotropha similis (Stainton, 1854) (= B. dufraneella)
 Bryotropha svenssoni Park, 1984
 Bryotropha senectella (Zeller, 1839)
 Bryotropha hodgesi Rutten & Karsholt, 2004
 Bryotropha branella (Busck, 1908)
 Bryotropha altitudophila Rutten & Karsholt, 2004
 Bryotropha montana Li & Zheng, 1997

Former species
Bryotropha plurilineella Chrét (nomen nudum)

Footnotes

References
 
 
  (2009): Bryotropha. Version 2.1, 2009-DEC-22. Retrieved 2010-APR-30.
  (2004): Butterflies and Moths of the World, Generic Names and their Type-species – Bryotropha. Version of 2004-NOV-05. Retrieved 2010-APR-30.
  (2001): Markku Savela's Lepidoptera and some other life forms – Bryotropha. Version of 2001-NOV-08. Retrieved 2010-APR-30.
 , 2000: New records of gelechiid moths from the Southern Siberia with description of three new species. Beiträge zur Entomologie 50 (2): 385-395.
 , 2003: Bryotropha patockai sp. nov.- a new species of Gelechiidae from eastern Centra Europe (Lepidoptera). Entomologische Zeitschrift 113 (3): 72-74.
 , 2004, Review of the Nearctic species of Bryotropha Heinemann (Lepidoptera: Gelechiidae). Zootaxa 740: 1-42.

 
Anomologini
Moth genera